Eben Fiske Ostby (born February 24, 1955) is a pioneer computer graphics software developer, animator, and technical director for motion pictures.

Ostby was born in Hampton, Connecticut, United States. He graduated from Pomfret School and Vassar College, where he was its "first computer science major". He joined Pixar when the company was a garage start-up, as one of the first four employees of its animation department along with John Lasseter. There, he worked on early breakthrough animation shorts such as Luxo Jr., Red's Dream, Tin Toy, Knick Knack, and For the Birds. He became Vice President for Software. In 1998, he shared the Academy Award, Scientific and Engineering with three other people for the development of the Marionette 3-D Computer Animation System. He has served as Computer Animation, Technical and Modeling Director on Cars 2005, A Bug's Life, Monsters, Inc., Toy Story, Toy Story 2, Young Sherlock Holmes and many other motion pictures.

Computer Animation
André and Wally B. (1984) 3-D animation programmer
Young Sherlock Holmes (1985) computer animation: Industrial Light & Magic
Luxo, Jr. (1986) animation software/modeler/rendering
Red's Dream (1987) modeling and animation software/models/technical director
Tin Toy (1988) additional animator/modeler/technical director
Knick Knack (1989) animator/technical director
Toy Story (1995) modeling & animation system development/associate technical director
A Bug's Life (1998) supervising technical director
Toy Story 2 (1999) modeling supervisor
For the Birds (2000) modeling supervisor
Monsters, Inc. (2001) modeling supervisor
Cars (2006) supervising technical director
Up (2009) senior technology team: Pixar
Brave (2012) senior technology team: Pixar
Monsters University (2013) film production resources: Pixar Studio Team
Inside Out (2015) production senior manager: Pixar
Piper (2016) special thanks
Coco (2017) production department head: Pixar
Incredibles 2 (2018) production department head: Pixar
Bao (2018) special thanks
Purl (2018) special thanks
Smash and Grab (2019) special thanks
Kitbull (2019) special thanks

References

External links
A Chat with Pixar's Eben Ostby on Geekdelphia

1955 births
American animators
Artists from Los Angeles
Living people
Vassar College alumni
Pomfret School alumni
Pixar people